Wiseton is a village in the Canadian province of Saskatchewan within the Rural Municipality of Milden No. 286 and Census Division No. 12. The village is located at the junction of Highway 44 and Highway 664 approximately 40 km southwest of Outlook.

History 
Wiseton incorporated as a village on September 23, 1913.

Demographics 

See also

 List of communities in Saskatchewan
 Hamlets of Saskatchewan

References

Villages in Saskatchewan
Milden No. 286, Saskatchewan
Division No. 12, Saskatchewan